A ring diacritic may appear above or below letters. It may be combined with some letters of the extended Latin alphabets in various contexts.

Rings

Distinct letter
The character Å (å) is derived from an A with a ring. It is a distinct letter in the Danish, Norwegian, Swedish, Finnish, Walloon, and Chamorro alphabets. For example, the 29-letter Swedish alphabet begins with the basic 26 Latin letters and ends with the three letters Å, Ä, and Ö.

Overring

The character Ů (ů; a Latin U with overring, or kroužek in Czech Republic) is a grapheme in Czech preserved for historic reasons, which identifies a vowel shift. For example, the word for "horse" used to be written kóň, which evolved, along with pronunciation, into kuoň. Ultimately, the vowel  disappeared completely, and the uo evolved into ů, modern form kůň. The letter ů now has the same pronunciation as the letter ú (long ), but changes to a short o when a word is morphed (e.g. nom. kůň → gen. koně, nom. dům → gen. domu), thus showing the historical evolution of the language. Ů cannot occur in initial position, while ú occurs almost exclusively in initial position or at the beginning of a word root in a compound. These characters are used also in Steuer's Silesian alphabet. The  pronunciation has prevailed in some Moravian dialects, as well as in Slovak, which uses the letter ô instead of ů.

ů was used in Old Lithuanian in Lithuania Minor from the 16th till the beginning of the 20th century and for a shorter time in 16th-century Lithuania Major for diphthong .

The ring was used in the Lithuanian Cyrillic alphabet promoted by Russian authorities in the last quarter of the 19th century with the letter У̊ / у̊ used to represent the  diphthong (now written uo in Lithuanian orthography).

ẘ and ẙ are used in the ISO 233 romanization of the Arabic alphabet. A fatḥah followed by the letter ⟨ﻭ⟩ (wāw) with a sukūn (ـَوْ) is romanized as aẘ. A fatḥah followed by the letter ⟨ﻱ⟩ (yā’) with a sukūn over it (ـَيْ) is romanized as aẙ.

The difficulty of type-writing it has led some writers to prefer ë for the same sound.

Many more characters can be created in Unicode using the combining character , including the above-mentioned у̊ (Cyrillic у with overring) or ń̊ (n with acute and overring).

In Canadian Aboriginal Syllabics, there are two ring characters: ᐤ (Cree and Ojibwe final w, or Sayisi o) and ᣞ (Cree and Ojibwe final w or final y).  This second smaller ring can combine as a diacritic ring above in Moose Cree and Moose-Cree influenced Ojibwe as a final y;  in Inuktitut, the ring above the /_i/ character turns it into a /_aai/ character.  In Western Cree, /_w_w/ sequence is represented as ᐝ.

Unicode has:

Underring
Unicode encodes the underring at 

The underring is used in IPA to indicate voicelessness, and in Indo-European studies or in Sanskrit transliteration (IAST) to indicate syllabicity of r, l, m, n etc. (e.g.  corresponding to IPA ). R with ring below, L with ring below, R with ring below and macron, and L with ring below and macron were actually proposed for Unicode because of their use in Sanskrit transliteration and the CSX+ Indic character set. However, the proposal was rejected, because they are already encoded as sequences.

In Pashto romanization, ḁ is used to represent .

Examples:

Emilian-Romagnol 
In Romagnol, e̥ is used to represent  in diphthongs, e.g. Santarcangelo dialect ame̥ig  'friend', ne̥ud  'naked'. In Emilian, e̥ can be used to represent unstressed  in very accurate transcriptions.

Half rings

These characters are used in the Uralic Phonetic Alphabet, respectively for mediopalatal pronunciation and strong-onset vowels. They are here given with the lowercase a: a͑ and a͗, a̜ and a̹.

Breve and inverted breve are also shaped like half rings, respectively, the bottom and top half of a circle.

Other uses
The ring is used in the transliteration of the Abkhaz to represent the letter ҩ. It may also be used in place of the abbreviation symbol ॰ when transliterating the Devanagari alphabet.

Letters with ring

Similar marks
The ring as a diacritic mark should not be confused with the dot or  diacritic marks, or with the degree sign °.

The half ring as a diacritic mark should not be confused with the comma or ogonek diacritic marks.

References

External links
Diacritics Project — All you need to design a font with correct accents

Latin-script diacritics